Scrawl was an American indie rock trio based in Columbus, Ohio, and active from the mid-1980s.

History
The band formed in 1985, originally under the name Skull. The founding members were Marcy Mays (lead vocals, guitar, songwriting), Sue Harshe (bass guitar, backing vocals, songwriting), and Carolyn O'Leary (drums). Their first show, in the summer of 1985, was a 20-minute opening spot for the Meat Puppets, and inspired the band to find a new name, "Scrawl", that sounded a bit like Skull. Their first album, Plus, Also, Too, was self-produced (with Andy Izold) and released in 1987 on the local label No Other Records. The following year the band was signed to the ill-fated Rough Trade Records U.S., for whom they released two albums, He's Drunk (produced by Jim Rondinelli) and Smallmouth (produced by Gary Smith).

When Rough Trade U.S. filed for bankruptcy in 1990, the band placed a successful bid to purchase back their master recordings during an auction held during the label's Chapter 11 proceedings. Their next release, a seven-track EP called Bloodsucker, was released on the Chicago-based Feel Good All Over label (then reissued on Simple Machines Records).

Drummer O'Leary left the group in May 1992, and was replaced by Dana Marshall.

They recorded their next album, Velvet Hammer, in 1993. It was engineered by Steve Albini (around the time he produced Nirvana's In Utero), and released on the Simple Machines label. The band was then signed their first major label deal with Elektra, for whom they released two albums, Travel On, Rider, and Nature Film. Only six weeks after Nature Film came out Elektra dropped Scrawl.

Marcy Mays appeared as lead singer on "My Curse" from the album Gentlemen by the Afghan Whigs. The Whigs also recorded a cover of "Ready" from Scrawl's He's Drunk with Mays sharing vocals with Greg Dulli. The recording was released as a B-side on the Afghan Whigs' Debonair single, and later appeared on a promotional CD The B-Sides/The Conversation and on the remastered 'Gentlemen' At 21. Mays performed live with the Afghan Whigs at the Reading Festival 1994 and, more recently, with the reunited Whigs at All Tomorrow's Parties I'll Be Your Mirror USA 2012.

Discography

References

External links
Sue Harshe's MySpace page

All-female bands
Musical groups from Columbus, Ohio
Proto-riot grrrl bands